Sturgeon is an unincorporated community in Sturgeon Township, Saint Louis County, Minnesota, United States.

The community is located 14 miles southwest of Cook at the junction of State Highway 73 (MN 73) and Saint Louis County Road 22 (CR 22).

Sturgeon is located 20 miles north of Chisholm.

Sturgeon is located near the Sturgeon River State Forest and the Superior National Forest in Saint Louis County.

References

Unincorporated communities in Minnesota
Unincorporated communities in St. Louis County, Minnesota